Göksay Demirhan (born 9 February 1970) is a Turkish alpine skier. He competed in three events at the 1988 Winter Olympics.

References

1970 births
Living people
Turkish male alpine skiers
Olympic alpine skiers of Turkey
Alpine skiers at the 1988 Winter Olympics
Place of birth missing (living people)
20th-century Turkish people